The 1946–47 Houston Cougars men's basketball team represented the University of Houston in the college basketball 1946–47 season. It was their second year of season play.  The head coach for the Cougars was Alden Pasche, who was serving in his 2nd year in that position.  The team played its home games at Jeppesen Gymnasium on-campus in Houston and were members of the Lone Star Conference.  Houston captured its second conference regular season title, and competed in the postseason in the 1947 NAIA basketball tournament where they were defeated by Arizona State–Flagstaff (now known as Northern Arizona) in the second round.

Schedule

|-
!colspan=5|Regular season

|-
!colspan=5|Houston Intercollegiate Tournament

|-
!colspan=5|Regular season

|-
!colspan=5|NAIA Division I Tournament

References

Houston Cougars men's basketball seasons
Houston
Houston
Houston